Pirkanmaa (formerly Häme North) is a Finnish constituency represented in the Parliament of Finland. It covers the administrative region of Pirkanmaa, with a population of 453,978. Pirkanmaa currently elects 18 members of the Parliament.

The constituency is largely urban, centred on the traditionally working-class city of Tampere. The largest party in the  parliamentary elections has been the Social Democratic Party of Finland, although it has as many seats as the conservative National Coalition.

Members of parliament 2017–2021

Sanna Marin
Ilmari Nurminen
Pia Viitanen
Marko Asell
Jukka Gustafsson
Anna-Kaisa Ikonen
Sofia Vikman
Pauli Kiuru
Arto Satonen
Sami Savio
Sakari Puisto
Veikko Vallin
Veijo Niemi
Iiris Suomela
Satu Hassi
Arto Pirttilahti
Jouni Ovaska
Anna Kontula
Sari Tanus

Current members of parliament 2011–
 Mikko Alatalo (Kesk.)
 Jukka Gustafsson (SDP)
 Harri Jaskari (Kok.)
 Saara Karhu (SDP)
 Pauli Kiuru (Kok.)
 Anna Kontula (Vas.)
 Laila Koskela (PS)
 Lea Mäkipää (SMP 1983−1995, PS 2011–)
 Martti Mölsä (PS)
 Arto Pirttilahti (Kesk.)
 Leena Rauhala (KD)
 Kimmo Sasi (Kok.)
 Arto Satonen (Kok.)
 Hanna Tainio (SDP) 
 Oras Tynkkynen (Vihr.)
 Pia Viitanen (SDP)
 Sofia Vikman (Kok.)
 Pertti "Veltto" Virtanen (PS)
 Samuel Mosquera (PPp)

KD = Christian Democrats
Kesk. = Centre
Kok. = National Coalition
SDP = Social Democrats
Vas. = Left Alliance
Vihr. = Greens

Election results

|}

See also
 Constituencies of Finland

Parliament of Finland electoral districts
Pirkanmaa